A sophomore in American English is a student in the second year of study at high school or college. 

Sophomore or Sophomores may also refer to:

 Sophomores (TV series), an American television series
 "Sophomore" (song), a song by Ciara from her self-titled 2013 album
 Fleetwings BT-12 Sophomore, a 1940s American trainer airplane
 The Sophomore, a 1929 American comedy film directed by Leo McCarey

See also
 Sophomore slump
 Sophomore surge
 Sophomore's dream
 Sophomoric humor